Bal Krishna Khand is a Nepalese politician and former Home Minister of Nepal. Khand is a central working committee member of the Nepali Congress party. Khand also served as the Defense Minister of Nepal under the  Second Dahal cabinet.

Political life 
Khand was the president of the NC youth wing, Nepal Tarun Dal. When the party was divided in 2003, Khand joined the Nepali Congress (Democratic). Khand was included in the Central Working Committee of the new party. NC(D) later merged back with NC, though. After the royal coup d'état, Khand was arrested and jailed. In the 2008 Constituent Assembly election and 2013 Constituent Assembly election he was elected from the Rupandehi-3 constituency. In the 2017, NC-RPP formed an alliance when Khand had to leave his constituency to Ex-Forest Minister Deepak Bohara from Rastriya Prajatantra Party. So, he was elected from the proportional of Nepali Congress.

Born in Syangja in 2017 BS, Khand has been active in politics since 2033 BS. Leading the Nepal Students Union and Nepal Tarun Dal, Khand, who is active in party politics, has previously taken charge of the Ministry of Irrigation and Defense. Khand has been the chief whip of the Nepali Congress, is now holding portfolio  Home Minister.

Electoral history

2013 Constituent Assembly election

2008 Constituent Assembly election

References

Living people
Nepali Congress politicians from Lumbini Province
Nepali Congress (Democratic) politicians
Nepal MPs 2017–2022
Nepal MPs 1991–1994
Government ministers of Nepal
Members of the 1st Nepalese Constituent Assembly
Members of the 2nd Nepalese Constituent Assembly
1960 births